The 12th Golden Globe Awards, honoring the best in film for 1954, were held on February 24, 1955, in the Cocoanut Grove at the Ambassador Hotel in Los Angeles, California.

Winners

Best Motion Picture - Drama
 On the Waterfront directed by Elia Kazan

Best Motion Picture - Comedy or Musical
 Carmen Jones directed by Otto Preminger

Best Performance by an Actor in a Motion Picture - Drama
 Marlon Brando - On the Waterfront

Best Performance by an Actress in a Motion Picture - Drama
 Grace Kelly - The Country Girl

Best Performance by an Actor in a Motion Picture - Comedy or Musical
 James Mason - A Star Is Born

Best Performance by an Actress in a Motion Picture - Comedy or Musical
 Judy Garland - A Star Is Born

Best Performance by an Actor in a Supporting Role in a Motion Picture
 Edmond O'Brien - The Barefoot Contessa

Best Performance by an Actress in a Supporting Role in a Motion Picture
 Jan Sterling - The High and the Mighty

Best Director - Motion Picture
 Elia Kazan - On the Waterfront

Best Screenplay - Motion Picture
Ernest Lehman - Sabrina

Best Foreign Language Film

Henrietta Award (World Film Favorites)
 Gregory Peck  and  Audrey Hepburn

Special Achievement Award
Walt Disney  for artistic merit in  The Living Desert

Cinematography - Color
 Brigadoon  photographed by Joseph Ruttenberg

Cinematography - Black and White
 On the Waterfront  photographed by Boris Kaufman

Promoting International Understanding
 Broken Lance - directed by Edward DmytrykCecil B. DeMille AwardJean Hersholt'''

New Star of the Year Actor
(Three way tie)

New Star of the Year Actress
(Three way tie)

Honor Awards

References

012
1954 film awards
1954 television awards
1954 awards in the United States
1955 in Los Angeles
February 1955 events in the United States